York Center is an unincorporated community in York Township, Union County, Ohio, United States.

York Center was platted in 1841. A post office called York operated from 1844 until 1905. As of 1877, the community contained one store, one blacksmith shop, and one church.

References

Unincorporated communities in Union County, Ohio
Unincorporated communities in Ohio